The Pittsburgh Steamship Company began operations in 1899 by Henry W. Oliver. In 1901 the company became a subsidiary of the United States Steel Corporation.

References

Bibliography 
 

Shipping companies of the United States
Great Lakes Shipping Companies
U.S. Steel